Estradiol butyrylacetate (EBA), sold under the brand names Follikosid and Klimanosid-R Depot (with testosterone ketolaurate and reserpine), is an estrogen medication which is no longer marketed. It is an estrogen ester, specifically, an ester of estradiol. It is administered by intramuscular injection and a single 10 mg dose has been said to have a duration of action of 2 to 3 weeks. The excretion of EBA in women has been studied.

See also
 Estradiol butyrylacetate/testosterone ketolaurate/reserpine
 List of estrogen esters § Estradiol esters

References

Abandoned drugs
Estradiol esters
Prodrugs
Synthetic estrogens